Keith A. Thomas (born 1 September 1961) is a former Australian rules football player and administrator who played with Norwood in the South Australian National Football League (SANFL) and Fitzroy in the Victorian Football League (VFL). Between 2011 and 2020 he was the chief executive officer of the Port Adelaide Football Club.

Playing career 
Thomas had a long career at Norwood, beginning in 1979 and ending in 1993 after he played his 304th league game. He played in their 1982 Grand Final victory over Glenelg and also starred in their 1984 premiership team where he was awarded the Jack Oatey Medal. At the end of the 1982 season he was drafted by the Melbourne Demons but never played with that club in the VFL.

In 1985 he won Norwood's 'Best and fairest' award and was also runner up in it on three occasions. Thomas kicked over 300 goals over the course of his career in the SANFL, topping his club's goalkicking in 1986. He also represented South Australia five times during his career.

His time with Norwood was separated by a two-year stint at Fitzroy, where he made a total of 28 VFL appearances.

Football administrator 
Keith Thomas was appointed the CEO of the Port Adelaide Football Club in 2011, and served in the role until 31 October 2020. Under his executorship, the club gained  independence from its difficult sub-licensing agreement with the SANFL and unified the playing operations in both the AFL and SANFL.

Honours 
An interchange bench member of Norwood's official 'Team of the Century', Thomas remained involved in the club after his playing career ended and has served on their committee and as a Director. In 2008 he was inducted into the South Australian Football Hall of Fame.

References

DemonWiki profile

1961 births
Living people
Australian rules footballers from South Australia
Fitzroy Football Club players
Norwood Football Club players
South Australian Football Hall of Fame inductees
South Australian State of Origin players
Port Adelaide Football Club administrators